This article lists political parties in Norway.

Norway has a multi-party system with numerous political parties, in which no party can easily gain a majority of the 169 legislative seats. Parties may cooperate to form coalition governments.

History

1884–1905
The oldest political party in Norway is the Liberal Party, which was formed in 1884. Shortly afterwards, the Conservative Party was formed in opposition. The main political cleavage at the time was the issue of parliamentarism, with Liberals in favor and Conservatives in opposition. Until 1903, Norway was, for all intents and purposes, a two-party system; the smaller Moderate Liberal Party joined the Conservatives in a de facto permanent electoral coalition from the 1891 election.

1905–1945
During the first years of the 20th century, major electoral shifts took place. In 1903, the leftist Labour Party gained its first 5 MPs, after having captured 10% of the national vote. For the 1921 elections, the former two-round, single-member district system was replaced with proportional representation, allowing for further gains for medium-sized parties such as Labour and the Farmers' Party, which had been formed the previous year. In 1927, Labour surged to first place nationally, a position it has held in every single election since then. In 1928, they formed their first government, ending the decades-long power-alteration between Liberals and Conservatives. This government, headed by Christopher Hornsrud, was short-lived, however; it lasted a mere 18 days. The Farmers' Party followed suit, sitting in government briefly from 1931 to 1933, under Peder Kolstad and Jens Hundseid. Despite the surge of previously minor parties, the Liberals and Conservatives retained significance, with Johan Ludwig Mowinckel (1933–1935) serving as the last Liberal prime minister to date. With the onset of World War II, Johan Nygaardsvold from the Labour Party served as de jure prime minister for a decade, from 1935 to 1945.

During the Nazi occupation of Norway, political opposition to the collaborationist regime of Vidkun Quisling and the Nasjonal Samling party was silenced and prosecuted; Nygaardsvold's cabinet went into exile in London in 1940, and did not return before 1945.

1945–2001
From the first post-war elections in 1945 until the 1961 elections, the Labour Party held an absolute majority in parliament, with its Einar Gerhardsen serving as prime minister for, in total, 17 years and 17 days. For most of this period, Norway was generally regarded as a dominant-party system, with the divided opposition, consisting of Liberals, Conservatives, Centrists, Christian Democrats and occasionally Communists, unable to match Labour. It was first in 1963, in the aftermath of the Kings Bay Affair, that the Conservative John Lyng was able to take power with support from the other non-socialist groups. With the gradual decline of the Labour Party, opposition figures such as Per Borten (Centrist), Lars Korvald (Christian Democrat) and Kåre Willoch served as prime ministers at various points during the latter half of the 20th century. 1973 saw the advent of anti-establishment parties such as Anders Lange's Party and the Socialist Electoral League, which would later become the right-wing Progress Party and Socialist Left, respectively. Both of these groups remained relatively isolated on the political scene for the subsequent decades; the Socialist Left did not enter government before 2005, while the Progress Party was not included in a centre-right pact before in 2013.

2001–present day
The parliamentary election in 2001 saw the collapse of the Labour Party's traditionally constantly large lead over non-socialist parties; they took a mere 24% of votes – a loss of 11 points – against 21% for the Conservatives of Jan Petersen. The short-lived Cabinet Stoltenberg I, a Labour government in office since 2000, stepped down in favor of a centre-right coalition of Liberals, Conservatives and Christian Democrats, led by the latter's Kjell Magne Bondevik. Following the 2005 election, the centre-left Red-Green Coalition won a majority in parliament, with Jens Stoltenberg returning as prime minister, and serving until 2013.

The 2013 election provided the bloc of the Conservative Erna Solberg a clear parliamentary majority, with 96 of the 169 seats in parliament. She formed a government with the Progress Party of Siv Jensen, breaking the latter's decades-long isolation from the other centre-right parties. Four years later the centre-right parties managed to retain the majority in parliament with 88 of the 169 seats. Solberg continued to serve as prime minister, with different combinations of government coalition partners, all four parties at some time were part of Solberg Cabinet. In the most recent election of 2021, the result swung in strong favour of the centre-left parties who gathered 100 of 169 seats in the Storting. This led to a new government with Jonas Gahr Støre as prime minister, consisting of the Labour party and the Centre party.

Political parties

Parties currently in Parliament

Non-parliamentary parties with elected local representatives

Non-parliamentary parties with no elected representation

Defunct parties

Major/parliamentary parties 

 Centre (Centrum) (1893–1903)
 Coalition Party (Samlingspartiet) (1903–09)
 Free-minded Liberal Party (Frisinnede Venstre) (1909–45)
 Future for Finnmark (Framtid for Finnmark) (1989–93)
 Labour Democrats/Radical People's Party (Arbeiderdemokratene/Radikale Folkeparti) (1906–36)
 Liberal People's Party (Det Liberale Folkepartiet) (1972–88)
 Liberal People's Party (Det Liberale Folkepartiet) (1992–2017)
 Moderate Liberal Party (Moderate Venstre) (1888–1906)
 Nasjonal Samling (1933–45), collaborationist party, only legal party 1940–45, banned
 Red Electoral Alliance (Rød Valgallianse) (1973–2007)
 Social Democratic Labour Party of Norway (Norges Socialdemokratiske Arbeiderparti) (1921–27)
 Socialist People's Party (Sosialistisk Folkeparti) (1961–76)
 Society Party (Samfundspartiet) (1932–49)

Minor parties 

 National Socialist Workers' Party of Norway (Norges Nasjonalsocialistiske Arbeiderparti) (1930–40), extraparliamentary
 Fatherland League (Fedrelandslaget) (1933–40 as political party)
 Democratic Party of Norway (Norges Demokratiske Parti) (1965–1979)
 Workers' Communist Party (Arbeidernes Kommunistparti) (1973–2007), extraparliamentary
 Reform Party (Reformpartiet) (1974–75)
 Norwegian Front/National People's Party (Norsk Front/Nasjonalt Folkeparti) (1975–91), extraparliamentary
 Stop Immigration (Stopp Innvandringen) (1987–95), Anti-immigration
 Christian Conservative Party (Kristent Konservativt Parti) (1989–98)
 National Democrats (Nasjonaldemokratene) (1990–1991), Anti-immigration
 Fatherland Party (Fedrelandspartiet) (1990–2008), county representation, Euroscepticism, Anti-immigration
 Natural Law Party (Naturlovpartiet) (1993, last active 2001)
 New Future Coalition Party (Samlingspartiet Ny Fremtid) (1993–98)
 White Electoral Alliance (Hvit Valgallianse) (1995–97), Anti-immigration
 Non-Partisan Deputies (Tverrpolitisk folkevalgte) (1997, last active 2009)
 Norwegian People's Party (Norsk Folkeparti) (1999, last active 2003), Anti-immigration
 National Alliance (1999–2006), Anti-immigration
 The Political Party (Det Politiske Parti) (2001)
 Reform Party (Reformpartiet) (2004–09)
 Abortion Opponents' List (Abortmotstandernes Liste) ( 2005, last active 2009)
 Norwegian Patriots (2007–08), Anti-immigration
 Vigrid (2008–09 as political party)

See also
 List of political parties by country
 Parliament of Norway
 Politics of Norway

References

External links

 w2.brreg.no
 NSD: European Election Database - Political parties of Norway 

 
Norway
Political parties
Political parties
Norway